MHR (formerly MidlandHR) is a provider of software and outsourcing services for HR, talent management, payroll and business intelligence. The company operates from its headquarters in Ruddington, Nottinghamshire, UK, and at one time reported that it supported the management, development and payment of just over 10% of the UK workforce.

History

Established by President and Founder John Mills in 1984, the company was set up as Midland Software Limited - before changing its trading name to MidlandHR - to supply human resource and payroll software to clients on ICL VME and IBM 370 mainframes.

In 1992 the company moved to its current headquarters, Ruddington Hall in Ruddington near Nottingham, and later acquired a second set of offices in the same area. As of July 2022, MHR employed more than 750 staff.

MidlandHR then started and continued to develop its solutions in-house. The latest software product iTrent was released in 2007, and is a platform to deliver end-to-end HR and payroll processing.

In 2011, MidlandHR acquired PBS UK; a company that offers HR and payroll services for small to medium-sized businesses.

In March 2016, MidlandHR re-branded and changed its name to MHR, as part of its expansion into the US market.

In August 2021, MHR was ranked as one of the top 10 payroll services providers by Payroll Index.

References

External links
 MHR website

Companies based in Nottinghamshire
Companies established in 1984
English brands
Human resource management software
Software companies of the United Kingdom